Franklyn De Karl Jones (born 4 April 1957 in Llantwit Major, Wales) is a British former auto racing driver. He is best known for competing in the British Touring Car Championship (BTCC)

Career
Jones started racing in 1981, finishing third in his debut season in the Junior Formula Ford 1600 Championship. The following year he finished as runner-up, then champion in 1983 of Brands Hatch FF1600. In 1985 he competed in the BRSCC Production Saloon Championship, finishing as runner-up. He went on to be champion of the series in 1986, driving a Fiat Strada. He spent one more season in the championship, this time competing in a Ford Escort RS Turbo.

He stepped up to the BTCC in 1988, competing for two seasons in his Duckhams backed Class A Ford Sierra RS500. During his time here, he managed two second place finishes. He did not return in 1990 due to budget reasons. He did compete in the Willhire 24 Hour race that yearIn 1991 he competed in selected events of both the Renault Clio Cup and Ford Fiesta Championship. Jones made a return to the BTCC in 1992, with a BMW M3 for the independent Techspeed Racing team. A troubled season ended after round ten at Knockhill with no championship points.

In 1993 Jones switched from touring cars to compete in the RS2000 rallysport series with a car owned by Blakes Ford of Liverpool. In 1994 he competed in the Ford Fiesta Championship entered again by Blakes and sponsored by Duckhams.

Racing record

Complete British Saloon / Touring Car Championship results
(key) (Races in bold indicate pole position – 1988–1990 in class) (Races in italics indicate fastest lap – 1 point awarded ?–1989 in class)

‡ Endurance driver.

Complete World Touring Car Championship results
(key) (Races in bold indicate pole position) (Races in italics indicate fastest lap)

Complete European Touring Car Championship results

(key) (Races in bold indicate pole position) (Races in italics indicate fastest lap)

References

Welsh racing drivers
1957 births
British Touring Car Championship drivers
Living people
Sportspeople from Carmarthenshire